Stadion am Schloss Strünkede is a football stadium in Herne, Germany. It is the home stadium of SC Westfalia Herne. The stadium holds 32,000 spectators and opened in 1910.

References

External links 
 Stadium information

Schloss Strunkende
SC Westfalia Herne
Sports venues in North Rhine-Westphalia